Kim Sa-yong (23 August 1944 – 2004) was a South Korean boxer. He competed in the men's light welterweight event at the 1968 Summer Olympics.

References

1944 births
2004 deaths
South Korean male boxers
Olympic boxers of South Korea
Boxers at the 1968 Summer Olympics
People from Gumi, North Gyeongsang
Sportspeople from North Gyeongsang Province
Light-welterweight boxers